NGW may refer to:
New Generation Wrestling, a wrestling promotion based in Hull, United Kingdom
Heraldry of the World, an Internet-based heraldic resource
Nat Geo Wild, a TV channel focused on animal-related programming, sister network to the National Geographic Channel
Ngan Wai stop, Hong Kong, MTR station code

NGW Capital Kft. A web designer & marketing company in Hungary